Pukara (Aymara for fortress, also spelled Pucara) is a  mountain in the Andes of Bolivia which reaches a height of approximately . It is located in the Oruro Department, San Pedro de Totora Province, west of the village of Huacanapi.

References 

Mountains of Oruro Department